Vinay Nadkarni (Hindi:विनय नाडकर्णी Vinay Nadkaranī, born: 1962) is an Indian banker at Mumbai, and a voice actor that specializes in dubbing foreign animated media.

He is best known for being the official Hindi dubbing voice of Disney character, Donald Duck and he has been voicing him since 1992. In an interview with IANS, he said that  he has been 'quacking' since childhood as a hobby.

Dubbing roles

Animated series

Animated films

See also

 Dubbing (filmmaking)
 List of Indian dubbing artists
 Prachi Save Sathi - Official Hindi dubbing voice for Minnie Mouse
 Javed Jaffrey - Official Hindi dubbing voice for Mickey Mouse and Goofy

References

1962 births
Living people
Indian bankers
Indian male voice actors
Businesspeople from Mumbai